Mallos may refer to:

 Mallos, a form of Saint Dane, character in the Pendragon series by D.J. MacHale
 Mallos (Cilicia), an ancient city in Cilicia, Anatolia
 Mallos (Pisidia), an ancient town of Pisidia, Anatolia
 Mallos de Riglos, a set of rock formations in Huesca province in Spain
 Mallos (spider), a spider genus
 Tess Mallos, Australian food and cooking, writer, journalist, author, and commentator

See also
 Mallo (disambiguation)